Miina is an Estonian and Finnish feminine given name.

People named Miina include:
Miina Äkkijyrkkä (born 1949), Finnish artist
Miina Härma (1864–1941), Estonian composer 
Miina Kallas (born 1989), Estonian football player
Miina Turunen (born 1973), Finnish actress

References

Estonian feminine given names
Finnish feminine given names